Transmash may refer to:

Engineering companies:
Transmashholding, a group of Russian engineering firms specialising in locomotive and rolling stock building, and diesel engine manufacture
Omsktransmash, A heavy engineering company based in Omsk
JSC Transmash, a Russian rolling stock company based in the Saratov Oblast
Transmash, Tikhvin, mechanical engineering plant in Tikhvin; former Centrolit and Kirov works subsidiary plants
Sport:
FC Transmash Mogilev, a former Belarusian football club based in Mahilyov
Transmash Stadium, a multi-use stadium in Mogilev, Belarus